The Mississippi State Department of Health (MSDH) is the primary state health agency of the government of the U.S. state of Mississippi. It was established in 1877 as the Mississippi State Board of Health and was renamed in 1982. It provides a number of public health services to Mississippi residents.

References

External links
 Mississippi State Department of Health

Government of Mississippi
State agencies of Mississippi